A pub quiz is a quiz held in a pub or bar. These events are also called quiz nights, trivia nights, or bar trivia and may be held in other settings.  Pub quizzes may attract customers to a pub who are not found there on other days. The pub quiz is a modern example of a pub game. Although different pub quizzes can cover a range of formats and topics, they have many features in common. The pub quiz was established in the UK in the 1970s by Burns and Porter and became part of British culture. The Great British Pub Quiz challenge is an annual event. Pub quizzes are a staple event at Irish pubs, where they are usually held in English.

History 
The pub quiz was established in the UK in the 1970s, mainly by a company called Burns and Porter, to get people into pubs on quieter nights. Popularity grew and grew over the next few years from just 30 teams to 10,000 playing each week in a Burns and Porter quiz.

Format 
Pub quizzes (also known as live trivia, or table quizzes) are often weekly events and will have an advertised start time, most often in the evening.

While specific formats vary, most pub quizzes involve written answers to questions which are distributed in written form or announced by a quizmaster.

One format for quizzing is called "infinite bounce". This format is generally used when the number of teams in the quiz is large – usually around 8–10. Every question is addressed to the team succeeding the team that answered the previous question. If no team answers the question, the next question is addressed to the team succeeding the team to whom the previous question was addressed.

Generally someone (either one of the bar staff or the person running the quiz) will come around with pens and quiz papers, which may contain questions or may just be blank sheets for writing the answers. A mixture of both is common, in which case often only the blank sheet is to be handed in. Usually a team hands their answers in for marking to the quiz master or to the next team along.

Teams 
It is up to the quizzers to form teams, which are generally based on tables, though if one table has a large group around it they may decide to split up. Some pubs insist on a maximum team size (usually between six and ten). The team members decide on a team name, often a supposedly humorous phrase or pun, which must be written on all papers handed in.

People often have to pay to participate – ranging from around £1 to £5 per person. This is often pooled to provide prize money. Many pub quizzes require no payment at all, as the event is simply a way to get paying customers into the venue, typically on less busy nights of the week.

Questions 
The person asking the questions is known as the quizmaster or quiz host. Quiz hosts often also mark and score answers submitted by teams, although sometimes teams will mark each other's answer sheets.

The questions are often set by a specialist company, who may also supply the host, or could be set by the bar staff or landlord, or be set by volunteers from amongst the contestants. In the latter case, the quiz setter may be remunerated with drinks or a small amount of money.

Often questions may be drawn from the realm of 'everybody knows' trivia, sometimes leading to controversies when the answers are false or unverifiable. Generally, specialist companies will have proof read and verified answers prior to supply, avoiding such issues. In addition, as the quizzes are not formal affairs, slight errors in wording may lead to confusion and have led to a 2005 court case in the UK.

Rounds 
There may be between one and more than half a dozen rounds of questions, totalling anything from 10 to upwards of 80 questions. Rounds may include the following kinds (most common first):

 Factual rounds – these are usually spoken, either over a public address system or just called out.  Common topics include:
 General knowledge – covering the topics listed below (if they are not in a separate round) and also topics such as history, geography and science and nature. There may well be more than one of these rounds.
 Sport – comprising the statistics and minutiae of popular, well-known sports and general facts about others.
 Entertainment – movies, TV shows and music (see also below).
 True or False – questions to which the answer is True or False.
 Picture round – these use photocopied or computer-printed hand-outs and consist of pictures to be identified, such as photos of famous people (possibly snapped out of context, or else partially obscured) or logos of companies (without tell-tale lettering), famous places or objects pictured from a strange angle.
 Who Am I? – A series of clues to the identity of a famous person (or thing). Clues are given in order of descending difficulty. The earlier a team can identify the correct answer, the more points they are awarded.
 Music round – these consist of excerpts (often only the intro or other non-vocal segment) of songs played over the PA system. Usually the teams must identify the song and also the singer or band (sometimes the year the song was released is also required). Variations include the inclusion of film soundtracks and TV theme tunes (requiring the title), and/or classical music (also requiring the composer). Some venues cannot play a music round because they do not have the proper licensing from performers rights organizations.
 Audio round – similar to music rounds, but sound clips are played from movies, television shows, YouTube videos, etc. 
 Puzzle rounds – generally on a hand-out sheet. These may consist of crossword puzzles, anagrams, Ditloids, Dingbats and basic mathematics problems.
 Novelty rounds – themed round a specific word or name (e.g. all the questions relate to a famous Norman); 'connections', where the last answer in the round provides a link to all the previous answers; true or false; and various others to break up the general stream of questions.

Bonus rounds 
In some quizzes teams are able to select one or two rounds as "jokers", in which their points will be doubled (or otherwise multiplied). Teams  usually select their joker rounds before the start of the quiz, although some rounds may be excluded. Teams who consider themselves to be particularly strong on certain subjects can improve their chances with a good joker round, but risk wasting the joker if the questions are unexpectedly difficult. The idea of using a joker in a game may come from the BBC television programme It's a Knockout.

Some quizzes include a bonus question, in which a single answer is required with one or more clues given each round making the answer progressively easier to solve. In some variants, the first team to hand in the correct answer wins either a spot prize or additional points to their total score. In others, the questions continue until all teams have the correct answer with each team been given progressively fewer  additional points the longer it takes them to submit the correct answer.

Jackpots 
Some quizzes add a small, separate round of questions to the end of a regular quiz, with the chance to win a jackpot. Each week an amount of money is added to the jackpot, and if no team answers the questions correctly, the money rolls over to the next quiz. The maximum amount of the jackpot may be limited by local gaming regulations.

Cash jackpots may be won by a variety of methods including one-off questions and dance-offs.

Marking 

In many cases, the papers are marked  by the quiz host.  Generally, teams will not mark their own answers to avoid accusations of cheating. An alternative method is to have teams swap papers before marking, though this is typically only employed when a large number of teams makes centralised marking unwieldy.

One or two points are scored for each correct answer; some quizzes allow half marks for "nearly right" answers (such as a celebrity's surname when their full name was required). In some quizzes, certain questions score higher marks, particularly if they are unusually difficult.

Cheating 

With the mass use of mobile phones and mobile internet access, cheating has become a problem for some pub quizzes, with covert calls and texts made in the toilets, recent newspapers and magazines brought along especially for the event, ringers and so on. Though a maximum number of members set for teams may help to prevent large numbers of people collaborating, groups posing as several distinct teams are quite common. Some quizzes now ban the use of mobiles and nullify the score of any team found to be cheating. Though more prevalent where large sums of money are at stake, cheating can be observed even for relatively low stakes.

Some quizzes also now ban re-entry to the pub after the quiz has started, in order to prevent team members from using public internet stations, public telephones and mobile devices out of sight of the quizmaster. Generally, though, a pub runs its quiz alongside its normal operation, making such a measure impractical.

Prizes 

Prizes are awarded to the highest scoring team, and often to runners-up. Prizes are usually one of the following:

 alcoholic drinks: a case of beer or some money on a bar tab to spend at that pub are common.
 cash: if money was charged for entry into the quiz, this is often pooled to form prize money. This may all go to the winning team. Alternatively, there may be a separate short set of questions or even a single 'jackpot' question or additional game after the quiz to win the cash; if no team gets the right answer, the money is typically rolled over, making a larger prize the next week.
 vouchers: such as cinema discount-coupons, food discounts, or even drinks vouchers for use at the bar holding the quiz.
 drink-related promotional items from a brewery, such as t-shirts and beer glasses advertising their products.
 miscellaneous or novelty prizes, such as chocolate or cheap toys. The winning team may get first choice to pick a prize from a range on offer.

Technology 
In a digital pub quiz wireless handsets replace the more usual pen and paper. A computer receives and records the answers from each team's handset and the results are exported to a spreadsheet at the end of the quiz. A time limit can be set for each question (e.g. 60 seconds) and it is possible to determine which team answers in the fastest time for spot prizes and tiebreaks.

Commercial projects 
As the pub quiz concept spread to the US in the 1990s, several companies formed to provide services to bars and restaurants organizing quizzes.  Different from the quiz league in the UK, US commercial pub quizzes typically involve more than just two teams and can have as many as 25–35 teams playing in a single location, with up to 6 people per team.  Quiz companies charge bars a fee for hosting the quiz, which may range from $80 per week to $175 or more depending on attendance.  At least 20 different pub quiz companies currently exist in the US, with most operating events concentrated in major metropolitan areas.

Leagues and competitions 

A quiz league is an organisation that runs quizzes, normally in pubs, though such competitions are distinct from the standard pub quiz as they will normally involve two teams and often include a number of individual questions. No prizes are normally awarded at such a league match, but prizes and kudos may go to the quiz team winning a league or a knockout competition. The National Trivia Association runs a nationwide contest involving various pub trivia games played around the US.

Teams from throughout a region, county, state or country meet annually for more prestigious competitions, with greater prizes. Representative teams may either be the best team from each pub, or a team selected from the best individuals.

Believe it or Not Quiz Events in New Zealand have held an annual Champion of Champions quiz in Auckland since 1999. Initially open to teams from pubs within the greater Auckland region, it is now open to teams from throughout New Zealand. In practice, travel costs prevent most teams from the lower North Island and the South Island participating, although Christchurch, Nelson and Wellington have all provided teams.

The Australasian Pub Quiz Championships takes place annually since 2018. Open to teams from pubs and clubs from across Australia and New Zealand, the 2018 Championships is simultaneously run in Sydney, Canberra and Wellington in late April.

In the United States National Trivia Association presents "The Riddle", a finals event open to eligible teams who play the official NTA "Quizzo!" live trivia game. Approximately a thousand players attended the 2008 event in Atlantic City, New Jersey.

Sporcle runs the Pub Champions Trivia League, which hosts regional, state, and national tournaments.

World record 
The largest pub quiz, according to the Guinness Book of Records, was the "Quiz for Life", held at the Flanders Expo Halls in Ghent, Belgium, on 11 December 2010 with 2,280 participants. The annual "World famous pub quiz" in Birmingham counted approximately 2700 participants across 260 teams in August 2016.

In popular culture 
Pub quizzes have appeared in the British sitcoms Minder, Bottom, Gavin & Stacey, The Office and Early Doors, amongst others. 
A January 2013 episode of Anger Management features Charlie Sheen's character involved in a game of bar trivia. 
The New Zealand television drama Nothing Trivial centres around five characters who meet regularly at a pub quiz.
The ITV game show Quiz Night with Stuart Hall was based on this concept.  The set on which the show took place had a bar theme to it; contestants and the host even drank beer while doing the show.
The Irish television drama Trivia from 2011 to 2012 focuses on the captain of a pub quiz team.

Regional

United States

In Philadelphia many bars specifically those owned Irish-American will have "Quizzo" nights.

Trivia nights are sometimes used as fundraisers for nonprofit organizations, and these are very common in the Greater St. Louis area.

See also 

 Drinking culture
 Quizbowl
 Quiz league
 List of public house topics

References 

Quiz games
Pub games
British culture
Student quiz competitions
Trivia
Entertainment